El Sieco's is a pub, bar, and music venue in Newport, Wales which opened in 2016 on High Street, Newport, following the closure in 2010 of TJ's.

TJ's was a key part of the Newport music scene and led to the 1990s label of Newport as 'the new Seattle'. The present owner, Ashley, is the grandson of John Sicolo, who died in 2010.

The new venue has proved popular, having been named in the South Wales Argus list of top 5 live music venues in Newport, and announced in 2019 it will be moving to larger premises at 13 Market Street, near to Tiny Rebel. The new venue is scheduled to open on 20 September 2019 and will offer an increased capacity of 350, two floors, with weekend evenings offering two rooms of music.

Background 
TJ's was a famous nightclub located on Clarence Place, which opened in 1985 and became an integral part of the so-called toilet circuit. The club, praised by John Peel, advertised itself as "The Legendary TJ's".

In 2010, John Sicolo passed away, reportedly having funded the club's upkeep in its poor quality building using much of his life savings. The original premises were held by administrators following his death, and later sold to the Hassan brothers of Cardiff. On 2 February 2013, the original building was damaged by a fire, suspected to be arson. It remains empty in 2019.
 
In 2012 John Sicolo's grandson, Ashley Sicolo, opened a resurrected venue, first named the 200 Club, on Stow Hill, the decor for which included TJ's memorabilia and copies of TJ's gig posters. In May 2013 indie rockers took part in a gig at the venue when PiL guitarist Keith Levene and Therapy? singer Andy Cairns played there. The club closed on 26 May 2013 due to complaints over noise.

In March 2016 Ashley again opened venue, now named El Sieco's on High Street in Newport city centre. It moved next door in 2018 and continues to do well, among the other revived music venues on High Street, including Le Pub.

See also 
 Music of Newport
 Music of Wales
 Newport, Wales
 Newport city centre
 TJ's
 Diverse Vinyl
 Le Pub

References

External links
 Official TJ's website as at 18 February 2010
 El Siecos - Facebook

Newport, Wales
Nightclubs in Wales
Culture in Newport, Wales
Landmarks in Newport, Wales
Music venues in Newport, Wales